Stanley L. Hough (Los Angeles, CA, July 23, 1918 – Los Angeles, CA, February 23, 1990) was an American movie executive and film and television producer.

He worked as an assistant director from 1952 to 1961. He then became vice-president in charge of production operations at 20th Century Fox. In 1971 he married the actress Jean Peters after she had divorced her estranged husband Howard Hughes. Hough then decided to become a producer and resigned his post at 20th Century Fox. His first job was on the successful movie Emperor of the North Pole starring Lee Marvin, Ernest Borgnine, and Keith Carradine. He then produced the Planet of the Apes TV series which only lasted for 13 episodes on CBS in September 1974. He wrote the stories for the successful westerns Bandolero! (1968) and The Undefeated (1969).

External links

20th Century Fox Biography, unofficial Planet of the Apes TV series website

1918 births
1990 deaths
American film directors
American film producers
American television producers
American film studio executives
20th Century Studios people
20th-century American businesspeople
Place of birth missing